Vashti is an unincorporated community in southeastern Clay County in the U.S. state of Texas.

History

In 1881 Dave Turner made application to the Federal Government for a post office in the name of his favorite niece Vashti Strahan. Bypassed by the Fort Worth and Denver Railway in 1882 and U.S. Route 287 in the 1930s, the town never flourished.  It did survive, however, as a local economic and social hub for area farmers.  It reached its peak population in the 1920s at 264, and the community had a number of businesses, including a cotton gin, three general stores, a drugstore, and a blacksmith shop; in addition, six churches and two fraternal orders operated locally. Its decline began in the 1950s as the urbanization of rural areas began across the United States following World War II.   By 1950 the population of Vashti stood at 140, which remained stable until 1980. Cattle raising, dairy farming, potterymaking, and fruit production are the area's major industries.

Education
Vashti is served by the Bellevue Independent School District.

See also
List of unincorporated communities in Texas

References

Book published by the local historical committee in 2003, 1881-2003 Vashti, TX

Unincorporated communities in Texas
Unincorporated communities in Clay County, Texas
Wichita Falls metropolitan area